Senator Winter may refer to:

Faith Winter (born 1980), Colorado State Senate
Winton A. Winter Sr. (1930–2013), Kansas State Senate

See also
Senator Winters (disambiguation)